Nuno Borges and Francisco Cabral were the defending champions and successfully defended their title, defeating Piotr Matuszewski and David Pichler 6–4, 7–5 in the final.

Seeds

Draw

References

External links
 Main draw

Maia Challenger II - Doubles